Henry Alexander Saturnin Hartley (December 18, 1861–October 14, 1934) was a missionary preacher, teacher, and doctor in Canada, the United States, and South America.

Biography 
Henry Alexander Saturnin Hartley was born on December 18, 1861 in Port of Spain, Trinidad (then known as the British West Indies).

He studied at the University of Paris and worked in Trinidad including overseeing a leper colony before being dismissed for negligence. Hartley went on to various church appointments and postings. He studied in Canada and the United States. He served as a pastor at churches in Burroughs, Georgia.

Hartley wrote a memoir in 1890.

Publications

References

1861 births
1934 deaths